New York most commonly refers to:

 New York (state), a state in the northeastern United States
 New York City, the most populous city in the United States, located in the state of New York

New York may also refer to:

Film and television
 New York (1916 film), a lost American silent comedy drama by George Fitzmaurice
 New York (1927 film), an American silent drama by Luther Reed
 New York (2009 film), a Bollywood film by Kabir Khan
 New York: A Documentary Film, a film by Ric Burns
 "New York" (Glee), an episode of Glee

Literature
 New York (Burgess book), a 1976 work of travel and observation by Anthony Burgess
 New York (Morand book), a 1930 travel book by Paul Morand
 New York (novel), a 2009 historical novel by Edward Rutherfurd
 New York (magazine), a bi-weekly magazine founded in 1968

Music
 New York EP, a 2012 EP by Angel Haze
 "New York" (Angel Haze song)
 New York (album), a 1989 album by Lou Reed
 "New York" (Eskimo Joe song) (2007)
 "New York" (Ja Rule song) (2004)
 "New York" (Paloma Faith song) (2009)
 "New York" (St. Vincent song) (2017)
 "New York" (Snow Patrol song) (2011)
 "New York" (U2 song) (2000)
 New York, a 2006 album by Antti Tuisku
 "New York", a 1977 song by the Sex Pistols from Never Mind the Bollocks, Here's the Sex Pistols

Places

United Kingdom
 New York, Lincolnshire
 New York, North Yorkshire
 New York, Tyne and Wear

United States

New York state
 New York metropolitan area, the region encompassing New York City and its suburbs
 New York County, covering the same area as the New York City borough of Manhattan
 New York, the US Postal Service address designating Manhattan
 Province of New York, a British colony preceding the state of New York

Other states
 New York, Florida, an unincorporated community in Santa Rosa County
 New York, Iowa, a former town in Wayne County
 New York, Kentucky, an unincorporated community in Ballard County
 New York, Missouri, a ghost town in Scott County
 New York, Texas, an unincorporated community in Henderson County
 New York Mountain, a mountain in Colorado
New York Mountains, a mountain range in California

Ukraine
 New York, Ukraine, a settlement in Donetsk Oblast

Ships
Many ships have been named after the city or state of New York. See:
 List of ships named New York 
 List of ships named City of New York
 List of ships named New York City

Sports

American football
 New York Giants, members of the East Division of the National Football Conference of the NFL (1925)
 New York Jets, members of the East Division of the American Football Conference of the NFL (1960)
 New York (World Series of Football), a professional football team for the World Series of Football (1902–1903)

Baseball
 New York Mets, members of the East Division of the National League of MLB (1962)
 New York Yankees, members of the East Division of the American League of MLB (1903)

Hockey
 New York Islanders, members of the Metropolitan Division of the Eastern Conference of the NHL (1972)
 New York Rangers, members of the Metropolitan Division of the Eastern Conference of the NHL (1926)

Soccer
 New York City FC, a professional soccer team based in New York City that competes in the Eastern Conference of MLS (2015)
 New York Red Bulls, a professional soccer team that competes in the Eastern Conference of MLS (1996)
 New York Stadium in South Yorkshire, home ground of Rotherham United FC

Other sports
 New York GAA, a county board of the Gaelic Athletic Association outside Ireland, responsible for Gaelic games in the New York metropolitan area
 New York Knicks, a professional basketball team, part of the Atlantic Division of the Eastern Conference in the NBA

Other uses
 New York (pinball), a 1976 pinball machine by Gottlieb
 New York (1983 typeface), an Apple font set for original Macintosh computers
 New York (2019 typeface), a font set for developing software on Apple platforms
 New York Harbor, a waterfront in New York City
 Brooklyn Navy Yard, referred to as New York in naval histories
 Tiffany Pollard (born 1982), star of the reality TV show I Love New York who is nicknamed New York

See also
 New York City (disambiguation)
 New York Cosmos (disambiguation)
 New York, New York (disambiguation)
 Nova Iorque, Brazilian municipality in the state of Maranhão
 Nowy Jork, former name of Łagiewniki, Włocławek County, Poland
 NY (disambiguation)
 SS New York, a list of ships
 SS New York City, a list of ships
 USS New York, a list of United States Navy ships and submarines